Discover My Body is a 2020 horror video game developed by Yames. The game was self-published and released on Itch.io on 8 March 2020 under a pay what you want model.

Gameplay 
Discover My Body is a small game, taking about 10 minutes to complete. The player takes the role of a medical student observing a bizarre future medical procedure intended to enhance human consciousness. The player has control of a medical scanner, allowing for the inspection of points of interests on the patient's body as the procedure progresses. Through different options on the scanner it is possible to explore the patient's body, skeleton and nervous system.

Plot 
The official premise of Discover My Body is "In the year 2040, human beings look for increasingly strange solutions in hopes of finding connection and community." The game is set in a time when humans have become very socially isolated owing to technological advancement and increasingly strange new ways to rebuild social connections are being explored. One of these ways, explored in the game, is so-called "flowering", in which a patient connects to, and is biologically transformed by, a fungus which psychically connects them to other people who have "flowered". Despite the horrific bodily mutations being experienced by the observed patient, the patient is increasingly giddy and happy with the transformation.

Development and themes 
Discover My Body was based on an old edutainment CD-ROM game titled Discover The World, in which players controlled a small Spanish ship and travelled out across a big white map with details and geography slowly being filled in as you reached new destinations; Yames wished to mimic this style and mechanic but make something "more interesting and horrifying". Discover My Body was as a result also envisioned as an edutainment game, albeit on a completely fictional topic.

Discover My Body was released on Itch.io for Microsoft Windows on 8 March 2020. The game was released for Ubuntu on 9 April 2020, alongside a full-screen version for Windows, followed by a release for macOS on 8 December 2020. A more fleshed-out sequel to the game, titled Discover Our Bodies is currently in development.

Reception 
Discover My Body was positively reviewed by Daniel Palacio of GamingOnLinux, who wrote that the game "with incredibly minimal elements manages to feel nihilistic and repulsive". Palacio however criticized that the game is played in such a small window and that the ending felt somewhat abrupt. The game also received praise by a review in DREAD XP, which found it to be a very unsettling experience. The review praised the unexpected tone (with the horrific transformation cast as something positive) and the minimalist graphics. Like Palacio's review, the short length of the game was however criticized.

References 

2020 video games
Indie video games
Horror video games
Single-player video games